The Sabanê language is one of the three major groups of languages spoken in the Nambikwara family. The groups of people who speak this language were located in the extreme north of the Nambikwara territory in the Rondônia and Mato Grosso states of western Brazil, between the Tenente Marques River and Juruena River. Today, most members of the group are found in the Pyreneus de Souza Indigenous Territory in the state of Rondonia.

Currently, there are less than 5 native speakers of the Sabanê language, with all the speakers being more than 50 years old. With no apparent transmission level, this language is considered as highly endangered when compared to the other two Nambikwara languages which have higher levels of transmission and preservation.

History 
Amongst the languages in the Nambikwara family, the Sabanê people have the smallest population size. During World War II, many Nambikwara territories suffered from invasions brought about by the search for rubber to supply the war. The installation of tappers resulted in the Nambikwara people being forced into hard labour. Many of the Sabanê people were amongst those forced to provide food crops for the tappers. Due to harsh working conditions, many of the Sabanê people tried to flee to the forest, however this action was met with violent retaliation from the tappers who would return them to the village and murder multiple leaders. In addition, Sabanê people suffered from epidemics brought on by contact with the invaders of their land. This led to an immense loss of lives bringing the Sabanê people close to extinction.
Around 1930, the arrival of the Jesuit Missionaries in the Cerrado region brought formal education to the Nambikwara region. By the beginning of 1940, there was the first school called “Irmãzinhas da Imaculada Conceição”, where small groups of children learned to read and write. Consequently, with arrival of rubber tappers many roads began to open near the Nambikwara villages, which allowed for the formalization of indigenous education.

Language Family 
The Nambikwara linguistic family has no known relationships with any other South American linguistic families. The word Nambikwara, Tupi in origin and meaning pierced ear, was designated to the people occupying the northwest Mato Grosso and the border areas of Rondônia. Along with Sabanê, it includes the Southern and Northern Nambikwara languages. These three branches of Nambikwara further include more than fifteen languages and dialects. Unlike Sabanê, Northern and Southern Nambikwara languages are well preserved with the Southern Nambikwara language having the highest level of transmission, with all its people being speakers of the language.

Linguistic Origins and Literature 
The first mention of the Sabanê people being described using this very distinction occurred in 1914, in an account from Cândido Rondon, a Brazilian explorer of Indigenous and Portuguese descent, while building a telegraph line through Nambikwaran land. Linguistic documentation did not occur until Claude Lévi-Strauss, a philosopher on a French cultural expedition did so in 1948. While there was documentation of the language concerning classification done in 1919 by Edgar Roquette-Pinto, and again in 1948 by Rondon and Faria, these two reports did not include any linguistic details.  Levi-Strauss however created a word list, comprising fifty-six words, and began to describe the morphology and phonology of Sabanê in some detail. Levi-Strauss concluded that it was not possible to determine at that point whether Sabanê belonged to the Nambikwara family given significant morphological and phonological differences with the other Nambikwara languages.  In the following years, Sabanê appeared in some comparative analyses and more developed documentation of the linguistics of Sabanê emerged from this. The most notable of these comparative studies comes from David Price, from the University of Brasília in 1978, who described the phonology of Nambikwara languages in comparison to one another.

Pedagogical Grammar 
A comprehensive linguistic description focusing exclusively on Sabanê did not emerge until Gabriel Antunes de Araujo's ‘A Grammar of Sabanê’, in 2004. Antunes de Araujo is a linguist and professor at the University of São Paulo. This book includes an extensive description of the phonology, morphology, syntax, adverbs, and interrogative words of the Sabanê language, along with some general historical and cultural information on the Sabanê people. 
Antunes de Araujo's work remains the most comprehensive and complete documentation of the Sabanê language, and was sponsored by CAPES (Coordenação de Aperfeiçoamento de Pessoal de Nível Superior), a body of the Brazilian government, as well as WOTRO, a Dutch organization.  Another notable documentation of the Sabanê language, Levi-Straus’ work, was supported by the French government.

Ethnography 
There have also been some (however very few) ethnographies on the Sabanê people- one of the most prominent being by Edwin Reesink in 2004, that primarily focuses on the cultural implications of names and naming in Sabanê culture, and was also sponsored by WOTRO. This lack of documentation and information tends to be significant for Sabanê culture and language; while it appears in a number of works, it is usually only mentioned with very little information provided.

Phonology 
Sabanê has 16 phonemes — 11 consonants and 5 vowels. Each has different allophones.

Consonants 
Sabanê's 11 consonants are shown in the table below.

The consonants used in Sabanê are similar to those for the Northern Nambikwara languages, although there are no implosives in Latundê. However, the Southern Nambikwara languages have different phonemes such as glottalized and aspirated consonants as wells as only one implosive  and one affricate .

Vowels
Sabanê has 5 phonemic vowels, listed in the table below.

Once again the vowels used in Sabanê are similar to Northern Nambikwara, but vary when compared to Southern Nambikwara. Southern Nambikwara has a much larger vowel inventory, including creaky and nasal vowels.

Morphology

The roots of nouns in Sabanê can only exist as parts of larger words (they are bound morphemes), and must be followed either by a referential suffix in isolation or by a referential or derivational suffix in context. There is no system for identifying a noun's gender morphologically, so gender must be inferred or indicated lexically. This is also the case for age and numbers. Possessive pronouns are not required. Compounding is used frequently, with the combined meanings of the individual words often being very different from the meaning of the final compound. There are seven different classifiers for nouns. 
The verbal theme is composed of a verbal root and verbal suffix, however these verbal suffixes can be attached to adjectives and numerals to make them verbal adjectives and verbal numerals. That being said, adjectives are actually considered verbs due to structural similarity. Morphemes are used to indicate an imminent action, while suffixes are used to indicate supposition, hearsay desire, and negation. Sentences can be either assertive, interrogative, or imperative. While the assertive and interrogative moods are marked by suffixes, the imperative mood is unmarked.

Pronouns 
Subject personal pronouns are mandatory in the absence of a nominal subject.
There are two classes of personal pronouns: subject pronouns, which are free morphemes except for pi– and object pronouns, which are bound morphemes.

In Sabanê the pronouns uli and towali are free morphemes which means that they do not appear affixed to the verb.

The pronouns p-, m-, t-, a- and pi-, ma-,ta- , are all bound morphemes, therefore they appear prefixed on the verb.

Note that in Sabanê, the third person singular and  plural subject are not phonologically expressed. The third person singular and plural object are only phonologically expressed when the verb begins with a consonant. (As seen below)

Negation of Verbs in Sabanê

In the Sabanê language, negation of a verb is not marked by a single word on its own like languages such as English or Portuguese. Instead, negation is marked by the particle -mi(si)na which is suffixed to the verbal theme. Because this particle is affixed to the verb it cannot stand by itself. Generally, the shorter form -mina is used more often that the longer form -misina.

However, in cases where the progressive suffix -say is used, -mi(si)na can optionally occur after this progressive suffix instead of after the verbal suffix. Native speakers do this switching, but the meaning of the sentence does not change.

Negation in the imperative mood is similarly obtained, by which the negative particle is suffixed to the verbal theme.

Lastly, because -mi(si)na is a bound morpheme it can not grammatically form a sentence. This means that when responding to a question negatively, a full sentence must be constructed.

Question:

Grammatical answer:

Ungrammatical answer:
* Mina
"No"

Oppositional morphological marking of assertive and interrogative sentences

Most languages in the world do not morphologically express an opposition between assertive and interrogative sentences. That being said, Sabanê uses an assertive suffix (-i), and an interrogative suffix (-a), attached to neutral tense forms of verbs.

While the few languages that do express a morphological opposition for assertive and interrogative sentences, they typically leave the assertive unmarked, while Sabanê marks both the assertive and the interrogative. The suffixes used to mark these ‘moods’ occupy the same syntactic slot, so the use of one suffix excludes the use of the other. In Sabanê the interrogative suffix must occur with a question word, such as ‘who’ or ‘what’.

Syntax

Case and Agreement  
 
In order to discuss Sabanê's case system, it is first important to define certain terms used to represent arguments of differing roles, and how they are used to classify case systems. These three terms are S, A, and P. S is used to describe the only nominal argument of a single-argument clause. A and P are used within multi-argument clauses however, with A describing the most-agent like argument and P describing the most patient-like argument. In Sabanê, patient S arguments of some intransitive verbs are marked the same as P arguments of transitive sentences, being marked by a -k. Conversely, A arguments as well as S arguments of transitive sentences are not marked. Given these conditions of Sabanê's system, it is categorized as Split Intransitive. A Split Intransitive case system is described as a system in which some S arguments are marked like transitive P arguments, while others are marked like transitive A arguments. The evolutionary process of this kind of system is typically made up of several successive developments over time, however given the lack of data for Sabanê the development of its particular split intransitivity is not known. The following examples are examples of the presence and absence of markings for S, A, and P arguments in Sabanê.

Patient S argument of intransitive verb (marked with -k)

S argument of transitive verb unmarked

A argument of transitive sentence

Agentive pronouns are used in Sabanê to mark volitional verbs (controlled actions), while patientive pronouns are used to mark non-volitional verbs (uncontrolled actions). Below is a table of the agentive and patientive pronouns in Sabanê.

While Sabane exhibits a split intransitive case system, this system has some specific rules. Objects expressed by nouns in transitive sentences must be marked by -k, and if it expressed by a pronoun the pronoun must be patientive. Subjects in transitive sentences are unmarked if they are a proper noun and the object is marked by -k. 
Agreement markers in Sabanê do not exist, shown particularly through the lack of grammatical gender, and lack of morphological opposition between animate and inanimate objects.

Semantics

Tense Structure
In Sabane, all sentences must include a tense morpheme, with the exception of sentences in the imperative mood. Unlike many other Brazilian languages, Sabane consists of three tenses: the past, the present and the future.  These tense morphemes are bound morphemes (suffixes) that appear after the verbal theme or other verbal suffixes in a sentence. Additionally, in Sabane evidentiality and tense are combined into a single morpheme. This means that this language distinguishes between evidential events (sensory or inferential) and non-evidential/ neutral events (neutral or inferred neutral), which is all marked with tense.
Note: the assertive morpheme -i or the interrogative morpheme -a can only be used to mark neutral tense.

The Past
The past consists of four forms, which are morphologically marked and based on evidentiality and non evidentiality.

-ntal assumes neutrality in the sentence.

-np is used when the speaker believes that an event could have happened based on inference.

-datinan is used when the hearer concludes that the sentence is factual based on the speaker's availability of sensory evidence.

-tika is used when the speaker uses hearsay evidence for the factuality of an event.

*note:-tika is only found in sentences preceding evidential sentences

The distinction between recent past (today) and less recent pass (yesterday and beyond) is expressed by using the adverbs ileypelu ‘today’ and ileytika ‘yesterday’.

The Present 

There are two morphemes that are used to mark present tense in Sabane: -al is used for the present neutral and -dana is used for the present evidential.
 
-al assumes neutrality in the sentence

-dana is used to infer factuality of the sentence and implies that there is sensory evidence

The Future 
There are two morphemes that are used to mark future tense in Sabane:  -tapanal is used for the  neutral future and -telon is used for the evidential future.

 -tapanal can only be used in a non-factual or elicited sentence 

-telon can only be used in a sentence in which the speaker is confident regarding its factuality

Vocabulary

Plant and animal names
Selected Sabanê plant and animal names from Antunes (2004):

{| class="wikitable sortable"
! Sabanê !! Scientific name !! English name !! Portuguese name
|-
| akona || Magonia pubescens || tingüi tree || tingüi
|-
| akukuʔ || Cerdocyon thous || Brazilian wild dog || cachorro do mato
|-
| ali || Bradypus tridactylus || sloth || macaco-preguiça
|-
| alowa || Bactris setosa || jucum tree || jucum
|-
| aynasapa || Hancornia speciosa || mangaba fruit || mangaba
|-
| aʔoluʔ || Dasypus novemcinctus || tatu-galinha, an armadillo species || tatu-galinha
|-
| bisikuli || Eunectes murinus || anaconda || sucuriju
|-
| dalama || Oenocarpus bataua || batava palm || patoá
|-
| doda || Tayassu pecari || white-lipped peccary || queixada
|-
| kiayleli || Tayassu pecari || white-lipped peccary || queixada
|-
| hakonata || Spaeleoleptes spaeleus || harvestman || opilião, olupião
|-
| halakata || Caryocar brasiliense || pequi tree || pequi (árvore)
|-
| halasapa || Caryocar brasiliense || pequi fruit || pequi (fruta)
|-
| haybakata || Dialium guianense || pororoca tree || jutai-pororoca
|-
| hieynakata || Oenocarpus bacaba || kumbu palm || bacaba (árvore)
|-
| hieynasi || Oenocarpus bacaba || bacaba fruit || bacaba (fruta)
|-
| holokalikata || Attalea phalerata || urucuri palm || acuri
|-
| ila || Ateles sp. || spider-monkey || macaco-aranha
|-
| ilunakata || Caryocar brasiliense || wild pequi || pequi
|-
| ilunasi || Caryocar brasiliense || wild pequi nut || pequi (fruto)
|-
| ineyla || Metynnis maculatus || spotted pacu (fish) || pacu
|-
| iwimata || Tetragonisca angustula || jatai bee || jataí
|-
| kali || Ceratophrys ornata || horned frog || sapo-boi
|-
| kamanasi || Atta sexdens || female ant || tanajura
|-
| kanaysi || Capsicum frutescens || pepper || pimenta
|-
| kapiʔ || Nasua nasua || coati || quati
|-
| kapune || Cuniculus paca || paca || paca
|-
| kayno || Carapus fasciatus || tuvira fish || tuvira
|-
| kaynomoka || Gymnotus carapo || catfish || sarapó
|-
| kela || Ara ararauna || blue and yellow macaw || arara-amarela
|-
| kiawa || Chordeiles, Podager || bacurau bird || bacurau
|-
| kiluma || Testudo tabulata || jabuti || jabuti
|-
| kina || Tunga penetrans || sand flea || bicho-de-pé
|-
| kita || Socratea exorrhiza || rasp palm || paxiúba
|-
| kiwkiw || Solenopsis saevissima || fireant || formiga-lava-pés
|-
| kokwayli || Mazama americana || deer || veado
|-
| koluma || Typhlonectes compressicauda || caecilian || cobra-cega
|-
| kowayiti || Hirundo rustica || swallow || andorinha
|-
| kowayitipan || Progne chalybea domestica || gray-breasted martin || andorinha-azul
|-
| kuli || Myoprocta acouchy || agouti || cutia
|-
| kulima || Amburana cearensis || cerejeira tree || cerejeira
|-
| malasi || Penelope superciliaris jacucaca || rusty-margined guan || jacucaca
|-
| misa || Maximiliana regia || inaja palm || inajá
|-
| misakata || Maximiliana regia || inaja palm tree || inajá (árvore)
|-
| misasapa || Maximiliana regia || inaja palm nut || inajá (fruto)
|-
| misasi || Maximiliana regia || inaja palm seed || inajá (semente)
|-
| mukunapi || Enterolobium contortisiliquum || earpod tree || timbó
|-
| mulula || Priodontes giganteus || giant armadillo || tatu-canastra
|-
| nutupiʔ || Bixa orellana || urucu || urucu
|-
| olopa || Apis mellifera || European bee || abelha-mel
|-
| oluma || Tapirus terrestris || tapir || anta
|-
| ota || Guilelma speciosa || peach palm || siriva
|-
| owayli || Ozotoceros bezoarticus || red deer || veado-campeiro
|-
| oya || Mauritia vinifera || buriti palm || buriti
|-
| pasika || Brycon matrinchao || matrinxã fish || matrinxã
|-
| pawla || Pterophyllum || cará fish || cará
|-
| piowla || Hoplias malabaricus || wolf fish || traíra
|-
| puwisa || Crax globulosa || wattled curassow || mutum
|-
| salaymulita || Pyrilia barrabandi || curica bird || curica
|-
| sapa || Piscidia erythrina || woody wine, Jamaica dogwood || timbó
|-
| siliko || Eigenmannia trilineata || tuvira rajada fish || tuvira rajada
|-
| sopa || Esenbeckia leiocarpa || Brazilian boxwood || guarantã (árvore)
|-
| sowaw || Lebistes reticulatus || rainbow fish || piaba
|-
| sowawsi || Leporinus elongatus || piapara fish || piau
|-
| sopa || Esenbeckia leiocarpa || Brazilian boxwood tree || guarantã
|-
| takipa || Cebuella pygmaea || marmoset || sauim
|-
| talama || Tupinambis teguixin || teju || calangão
|-
| talawa || Ara chloroptera || red macaw || arara-vermelha
|-
| tapayli || Renealmia exaltata || pacoba tree || pacova
|-
| tapaytapay || Corallus caninus || emerald tree boa || cobra-papagaio
|-
| tokaliʔ || Bertholletia excelsa || Brazilian nut tree || castanheira
|-
| tomuʔtomuʔ || Penelope jacucaca || white-browed guan || jacucaca grande
|-
| totaliʔ || Tolypeutes tricinctus || three-banded armadillo || tatu-bola
|-
| towakaliʔ ||  || red-head cayman || jacaré da cabeça vermelha
|-
| tutinakapawli || Aratinga jandaya || jandaya parakeet || jandaí
|-
| ulila || Tamandua tetradactyla || lesser ant-eater || tamanduá-mirim
|-
| ulima || Ficus anthelmintica || caxinguba tree || caxinguba
|-
| ulumusuʔ || Columbina minuta || dove || rolinha, pomba
|-
| ulununuʔ || Cebus capucinus || white-faced capuchin || macaco capuchino
|-
| uma || Hydrochoerus capybara || capybara || capivara
|-
| upa || Tinamus solitarius || macuca bird || macuco
|-
| ute || Eira barbara || tayra || irara
|-
| uykilapita || Lagothrix lagotricha || big bellied woolly monkey || macaco-barrigudo
|-
| wakawlu || Casmerodius albus egretta || heron || cegonha
|-
| walawaka || Ara macao || red and blue macaw || araracanga
|-
| walawka || Leporinus macrocephalus || piauçu fish || piauçu
|-
| walayena || Ramphastos toco || toucan || tucano
|-
| walaynunu || Egretta garzetta || little egret || garça
|-
| wani || Meleagris gallopavo || turkey || 
|-
| wanisi || Rhea americana || rhea || ema
|-
| wawawsi || Trigona spinipes || arapuã || arapuã
|-
| waylinawa || Lutra platensis || otter || lontra
|-
| waylinun || Pteronura brasiliensis || beaver || ariranha
|-
| waypulukata || Campomanesia xanthocarpa || gabiroba tree || gabiroba (árvore)
|-
| waypulusapa || Campomanesia xanthocarpa || gabiroba fruit || gabiroba (fruta)
|-
| waysili || Euterpe precatoria || assai palm || açaí
|-
| wayulupi || Chrysocyon brachyurus || cat; guara-wolf || lobo-guará
|-
| wayulutapayli || Panthera onca || spotted jaguar || onça-pintada
|-
| wialakata, mialakata || Hymenaea courbaril || jatoba tree || jatobá (árvore)
|-
| wialasapa, mialasapa || Hymenaea courbaril || jatoba fruit || jatobá (fruta)
|-
| wiawlu || Tinamus sp. || tinamou bird || nambu
|-
| yalawoka || Maranta arundinacea || arrowroot || araruta
|-
| yalay || Euphractus sexcinctus || peludo armadillo || tatu-peba
|-
| yamotoka || Constrictor constrictor || boa || jibóia
|-
| yeyeyla || Pitangus sulphuratus || great kiskadee || bem-te-vi
|-
| yolola || Inga edulis || ice cream bean tree || ingá
|-
| yomotokamoka || Bothrops jararaca || viper || jararaca
|-
| yoto || Astrocaryum aculeatum || star-nut palm || tucum, tucumã
|-
| yowayli || Didelphis marsupialis || opossum || gambá
|-
| yowitakata || Saccharum officinarum || sugar cane || cana-de-açúcar
|-
| yubana || Colocasia esculenta || taro || taioba
|}

References

NEUT:neutral tense
ASSR:assertive

Nambikwaran languages
Endangered indigenous languages of the Americas